Cliff Anthony Politte /pɒˈliːt/ (born February 27, 1974) is an American former professional baseball (right-handed) relief pitcher, who played in Major League Baseball (MLB) for four big league teams. He was selected in the 54th round of the 1995 Major League Baseball Draft by the St. Louis Cardinals as the 1438th player selected. He threw the first pitch at the new Roger Dean Stadium in spring training, that year.

Politte was designated for assignment by the White Sox on July 15, after giving up a home run to Bubba Crosby and was released on July 20.

On February 14, 2007, the Cleveland Indians signed Politte to a minor league deal. He pitched only eight innings for their Double-A team in 2007.

On December 21, 2007, the St. Louis Cardinals signed Politte to a minor league deal, with an invitation to spring training. He became a free agent at the end of the season. Politte resides in St. Louis, Missouri.

References

External links

1974 births
Living people
Akron Aeros players
American expatriate baseball players in Canada
Arkansas Travelers players
Baseball players from Missouri
Charlotte Knights players
Chicago White Sox players
Clearwater Phillies players
Jefferson Vikings baseball players
Major League Baseball pitchers
Memphis Redbirds players
Peoria Chiefs players
Philadelphia Phillies players
Reading Phillies players
Scranton/Wilkes-Barre Red Barons players
St. Louis Cardinals players
Syracuse SkyChiefs players
Toronto Blue Jays players
Prince William Cannons players